Robin Leamy (born April 1, 1961) is an American former competition swimmer of Samoan and New Zealand descent who participated in the 1984 Summer Olympics in Los Angeles, California.  He earned a gold medal by swimming for the winning U.S. team in the preliminary heats of the 4×100-meter freestyle relay. Leamy also represented the U.S. in the Pan American and World Games, where he was a member of several U.S. World Record setting relay teams (4x100 meter freestyle relay).  Leamy also held the world record in the 50 meter freestyle from 1981 through 1985.

Leamy received an athletic scholarship to attend the University of California, Los Angeles (UCLA), where he played both water polo (under coach Bob Horn) and swam (for coach Ron Ballatore).  An All-American in both sports, he was the NCAA individual national champion in the 50 and 100-yard freestyle in 1982.  In addition he anchored the 4x100 yard freestyle relay which set an American and U.S. Open Record, and captured UCLA's first and only NCAA swimming championship.

See also 
 List of Olympic medalists in swimming (men)
 List of University of California, Los Angeles people
 List of World Aquatics Championships medalists in swimming (men)
 World record progression 50 metres freestyle
 World record progression 4 × 100 metres freestyle relay

References

1961 births
Living people
Sportspeople from Apia
Samoan emigrants to the United States
American male freestyle swimmers
Olympic gold medalists for the United States in swimming
Swimmers at the 1983 Pan American Games
Swimmers at the 1984 Summer Olympics
UCLA Bruins men's swimmers
World Aquatics Championships medalists in swimming
Medalists at the 1984 Summer Olympics
Pan American Games gold medalists for the United States
Pan American Games medalists in swimming
Medalists at the 1983 Pan American Games